A Plain Introduction to the Criticism of the New Testament: For the Use of Biblical Students is one of the books of Frederick Henry Ambrose Scrivener (1813–1891), biblical scholar and textual critic. In this book Scrivener listed over 3,000 Greek manuscripts of the New Testament, as well as manuscripts of early versions. It was used by Gregory for further work.

The book was published in four editions. The first edition, published in 1861, contained 506 pages. The second edition (1874) was expanded into 626 pages; the third into 751 pages; and the fourth into 874 pages. Two first editions were issued in one volume; in the third edition the material was divided into two volumes, with an increased number of chapters in each. The first volume was edited in 1883, the second in 1887. The fourth edition was also issued in two volumes (1894). The fourth edition of the book was reprinted in 2005 by Elibron Classics.

First Edition 

The text of the first edition was divided into nine chapters and three Indices were added at the end (pp. 465–490). All plates were placed at the end of book (after Indices). The main part of the work are descriptions of the manuscripts. Scrivener concentrated his attention on the most important manuscripts (especially five larger uncial codices). The later cursive manuscripts were too numerous to be minutely described as per the uncials. Scrivener described them with all possible brevity, dwelling only on a few which presented points of special interest and used a system of certain abbreviations. Lists of this abbreviations was included just before the Catalogue of cursive manuscripts. Examples of abbreviations, include: 
 Act. — MS. of Acts and Catholic epistles
 Am. — the Ammonian Sections
 Eus. — the Eusebian Canons
 Eus. t. — a table of the Eusebian Canons
 Carp. — Epistula ad Carpianum
 κεφ. — the numbers of the  majora stand in the margin
 lect. — the book is adapted for Church-reading by notices of the proper lessons, feasts etc. in the margin, or above, or below
 men. — a menology, calendar of Saints' Days, is found at the beginning or end of the book
 syn. — Synaxarion, a calendar of the daily lessons throughout the year is given
 mut. — the copy described is mutilated
 pict. — the copy is illuminated with pictures
 prol. — contains prolegomena before the several books

In every next edition of the Plain Introduction this system of abbreviations was expanded (e.g. Αναγ., Argent., etc.). At the end of lists the manuscripts are described more shortly, in two columns, only numbers of the manuscripts, with the corresponding number of other system of catalogization (Scholz):

In the preface to the first edition, the editor announced: 
The following pages are chiefly designed for the use of those who have no previous knowledge of the Textual Criticism of the New Testament; but since the Author has endeavoured to embody in them the results of very recent investigations, he hopes that they may prove of service to more advanced students. He asks the reader's indulgence for the annexed list of Addenda et Corrigenda, both by reason of the peculiar character of his work, and the remoteness of West Cornwall from Public Libraries. He might easily have suppressed the greater part of them, but that he has honestly tried to be accurate, and sees no cause to be ashamed of what Person has well called "the common lot of authorship." He has only to add that he has not consciously borrowed from other writers without due acknowledgement, and to return his best thanks to the Rev. H. O. Coxe for important aid in the Bodleian, and to Henry Bradshaw Esq., Fellow of King's College, for valuable instruction respecting manuscripts in the University Library at Cambridge.
 Falmouth, September, 1861.

Second edition 
In 1873 Dean Burgon in The Guardian published several articles with some suggestions, corrections, and encouragement for preparing the second edition of Plain Introduction. Burgon gave a photograph of the Codex Basilensis for the sake of the next edition (the facsimile from the first edition was a poor quality).

The second edition was published in 1874. The number of chapters was still the same, but they were expanded (especially chapter II and IX). Many corrections to the third section of the second chapter were made after suggestions of: H. Bradshaw, Hort, Vansittart, Kelly, and Burgon. In preface to the first edition, the editor announced:

The first edition of this work, published in 1861, was received so favourably that the author has felt bound to bestow his utmost care upon a minute and thorough revision of his book, in the hope of bringing up the information it contains to the existing state of knowledge. In this endeavour he has been assisted as well by Canon Lightfoot, to whom he is indebted for that section of the third chapter which treats of Egyptian versions of the New Testament (pp. 319-357), as also by much unsought for and most welcome help, especially on the part of those scholars who are named in p. 164, note. Without wishing to speak harshly of writers who are not very scrupulous in such matters, he has always thought it became him to borrow from no quarter without making a full and frank avowal of the fact. The author will be much rejoiced if this new edition shall be judged not less worthy than its predecessor to become a text book in Universities and Theological Celleges.
 S. Gerrans, August, 1861.

Third edition 
In August, 1874, Ezra Abbot sent to Scrivener a letter: the rough draught of which covered forty odd pages, devoted to the correction of apparent errors and a statement of overlooked facts in the first edition of the Plain Introduction. The letter came too late to be used in preparing the body of the second edition of Scrivener's work. Abbot's studies largely argumented the number of suggestions, particularly in those portions of the book devoted to describing the extant manuscripts. They were accumulated in great part to the older and well-known authorities - such as Griesbach, Matthaei, Scholz (particularly his work Biblisch-kritische Reise, Leipzig 1823), Bianchini, Montfaucon, Silvestre, Bandini, Laubecius, and Zaeagni. Part of suggestions were a result of Abbott's studies of recent edited Catalogues of the ancient Greek Manuscripts held in the British Museum, Bodleian Library, Oxford Catalogues, Kitchin's Catalogue of the manuscripts in the Library of Christ Church College (Oxrofd, 1867). Abbott added numerous references to facsimile editions.

In 1885 J. Rendel Harris, together with Abbot, prepared the similar work as the first unpublished work of Abbot, nine years earlier. It was published under the title: Notes on Scriveners' "Plain introduction to the criticism of the New Testament," 3rd edition, in which they proposed corrections. Example of corrections:
 Page XII. On "p. 69. note", line 2, for "360" read "1160".
 Page XIII. On "p. 141, line 28", line 2, for "Vol. II., Part I." read "Part I, Vol. II.". At end. add "after p. 492."
 Page XIV. On "Y", line 8, for "XXIII, 23" read "XXIII, 5"; line 9, for "II, 21-IV. 1; 15-v. 1" read simply "II. 21-v.I" - since Dr. Gregory discovered two additional leaves; see the Prolegomena, to Tischendorf, p. 440.
 On "p. 162, line 24", line 2, for "Vol. II., Pt. I." read "Pt. I. Vol. II."

The third edition was issued into two volumes, with an increase of chapters in each (XIV + XII).

The third edition was prepared under great disadvantage. Scrivener after adding 125 pages to his book had an attack of paralysis, as result his work was not wholly conducted upon the same high level as his previous publications. The framework of the second edition was originally adopted; and the new additional material was only added to the almost unchanged material.

Fourth edition 
The fourth and the last edition of Plain Introduction was prepared and edited posthumously by Edward Miller (1825–1901). The book was edited by George Bell & Sons. It contains 15 plates with the texts of 40 manuscripts in facsimile (the 1st edition had 12 plates with 36 manuscripts). Some facsimiles were replaced. Instead of 2,094 manuscripts, as recorded in the third edition under six classes, no less than 3,791 were recorded in this edition, an increase of 236 beyond the 3,555 of Gregory, without counting the numerous vacant places which had been filled inp.

Most of the accounts of ancient versions were rewritten by distinguished scholars, who were leaders in their several departments. The early part of Volume I was enriched from the admirable book on "Greek and Latin Palaeography", by Edward Maunde Thompson. Many corrections suggested by eminent scholars were introduced in different places throughout the book. H. J. White rewrote the chapter on Latin versions. G. H. Gwilliam, editor of the Peshitta, helped to improve the passages on the Peshitta and the Curetonian Version. H. Deane made an additions to the treatment of the Harkleian Version. A. C. Headlam made a revision of the long chapter on the Egyptian versions; F. C. Conybeare, rewrote the sections on the Armenian and Georgian versions; Margoliouth rewrote the sections on the Arabic and Ethiopic versions; J. M. Bebb rewrote the section on the Slavonic version; James W. Bright rewrote the section on the Anglo-Saxon Version.

Contents of the 4th edition

Volume I 

 Chapter I, pages 1–20 – Preliminary considerations
 Chapter II, pages 21–55 – General character of the Greek manuscripts of the New Testament (materials for writing, style of writings, abbreviations).
 Chapter III, pages 56–89 – Divisions of the text, and other particulars (Ammoniam Sections, Eusebian Canons, Euthalian chapters, subscriptions, marginal markings, Synaxarion, Menologion)
 Chapter IV, pages 90–130 – The larger uncial manuscripts of the Greek Testament (Sinaiticus, Alexandrinus, Vaticanus, Ephraemi and Bezae)
 Chapter V, pages 131-168 – Uncial manuscripts of the Gospels
 Chapter VI, pages 169-188 – Uncial manuscripts of the Acts and Catholic epistles, of St. Paul's epistles, and of the Apocalypse
 Chapter VII, pages 189-240 – Cursive manuscripts of the Gospels. Part I. 1-449
 Chapter VIII, pages 241-271 – Cursive manuscripts of the Gospels. Part II. 450-774
 Chapter IX, pages 272-283 – Cursive manuscripts of the Gospels. Part III. 775-1321
 Chapter X, pages 284-306 – Cursive manuscripts of the Acts and Catholic epistles, 1-420
 Chapter XI, pages 307-319 – Cursive manuscripts of St. Paul's epistles, 1-491
 Chapter XII, pages 320-326 – Cursive manuscripts of the Apocalypse, 1-184
 Chapter XIII, pages 327-367 – Evangelistaries, or Manuscript Service-Books of the Gospels, 1-963
 Chapter XIV, pages 368-376 – Lectionaries containing the Apostolos or Praxapostolos, 1-288

Volume II 

 Chapter I, pages 1–5 – Ancient Versions
 Chapter II, pages 6–40 – Syriac Versions (Peshitta, Curetonian, Harklean, Palestinian)
 Chapter III, pages 41–90 – Latin Versions (Old Latin, Vulgate)
 Chapter IV, pages 91–144 – Egyptian or Coptic Versions (Bohairic, Sahidic, Fayyumic, Akhmimim)
 Chapter V, pages 145-166 – The Other Versions of the New Testament (Gothic, Armenian, Georgian, Ethiopian, Arabic)
 Chapter VI, pages 167-174 – Quotations from the Fathers
 Chapter VII, pages 175-243 – Early Printed Editions, Critical Editions (Complutensian Polyglote, Novum Instrumentum omne, Editio Regia)
 Chapter VIII, pages 244-256 – Textual Canons
 Chapter IX, pages 257-273 – History of the Text
 Chapter X, pages 274-311 – Recent Views of Comparative Criticism
 Chapter XI, pages 312-320 – Character of the Dialect of the Greek Testament
 Chapter XII, pages 321-413 – Application of Principles to Select Passages

Reception 

Edward Miller, the editor of the 4th edition, in 1886 estimated the 3rd edition:
The labour spent by Dr. Scrivener upon Textual Criticism is well known from his admirable Introduction to the Science, a handbook which leaves hardly anything, if anything, to be desired.

Eberhard Nestle, editor of Novum Testamentum Graece, wrote in 1901:
Scrivener have rendered great service in the way of collating manuscripts, (...) as well as Gregory in Germany has also catalogued them.

Gregory, another textual critic, in his Textkritik des Neuen Testaments (1900–1909) very often cited work of Scrivener, but after Minuscule 449 he used different way of numbering for the manuscripts (Scrivener 450 = Gregory 581, Scrivener 451 = Gregory 582). 
A Plain Introduction... was also used by Hermann von Soden in his Schriften....

References

Further reading 
 F. H. A. Scrivener, A Plain Introduction to the Criticism of the New Testament, etc. third edition, thoroughly revised, enlarged, and brought down to the present date, Cambridge and London, 1883, Volumes I-II
 F. H. A. Scrivener, A Plain Introduction to the Criticism of the New Testament. For the Use of Biblical Students, Fourth Edition, Volumes I-II, reprinted by Elibron Classics series (2005), Adamant Media Corporation,  (paperback),  (hardcover)

External links 
 Editions of the book
 A Plain Introduction to the Criticism of the NT (1861), First Edition (HTML)
 A Plain Introduction to the Criticism of the NT, (Cambridge, 1874), Second Edition at the Internet Archive
 A Plain Introduction to the Criticism of the NT (1883), Third Edition, Volume I at the Internet Archive
 A Plain Introduction to the Criticism of the NT, (1894), Fourth Edition, Volume I at the Internet Archive
 A Plain Introduction to the Criticism of the NT (1894), Fourth Edition, Volume II at the Internet Archive

 Other
 Ezra Abbot & J. Rendel Harris, Notes on Scriveners' "Plain introduction to the criticism of the New Testament," 3rd edition [microform] (1885)
 J.H. Bernard, Scrivener's `Introduction to the Criticism of the New Testament`, Hermathena, vol. IX, Dublin 1896, p. 105-117.

1894 non-fiction books
Biblical criticism
George Bell & Sons books